Novara may refer to:

Places
 Novara, a city in Piedmont
 Province of Novara, whose capital is the city
 The Roman Catholic Diocese of Novara, whose seat is the city’s cathedral
 Novara Calcio, its football club
 Battle of Novara (1513)
 Battle of Novara (1849)
 Novara di Sicilia, a commune (municipality) in the Province of Messina, Sicily
 Casaleggio Novara, a commune (municipality) in the Province of Novara, Piedmont
 Cascina Novara, a locality within the commune of Ghedi in the Province of Brescia, Lombardy

Other uses
 SMS Novara, several ships
 Novara (bicycles), a brand name used by the American consumers’ cooperative REI for its in-house brand bicycles and bicycle accessories
 157 Infantry Division Novara, an Italian infantry division of World War II
 Novara Media, a UK alternative media organisation

See also
 Navara (disambiguation)